Karin Olah is a contemporary artist in Charleston, South Carolina. She combines hand-dyed fabric and paint to create her signature multi-layered paintings. Olah is known in the American South for her fabric collages which mimic elements of the natural world. Her imagery is informed by quilt-making as well as the light patterns and colors of coastal landscapes.

About 
Olah was born in 1977 and is from Lancaster County, Pennsylvania. She attended the Maryland Institute College of Art (MICA), receiving a B.F.A. in fiber art in 1999. Following art school, Olah worked for several years in Manhattan managing a textile studio with couture fashion designer clients such as Donna Karan, Marc Jacobs, and Ralph Lauren. Olah's work is found in private and corporate collections including the Medical University of South Carolina’s Contemporary Carolina Collection, the City of Charleston's Office of Cultural Affairs; and the Shoestring Publishing Company.

References

External links 

David Pelfrey, Black & White, Abstract Planes, October 30, 2008.
 Catherine Hagood, Artist starts a new 'Thread' Olah's art enjoying acclaim, Charleston Post & Courier, 06/08/06.
 Nick Smith, Amish Incantations: Karin Olah aims for geometric elegance, Charleston City Paper, October 31, 2007.
 An interview with the artist at MyArtSpace
 Article featuring Karin Olah and other emerging artists in Charleston Magazine
 Represented by Hillary Whitaker Gallery, Gregg Irby Gallery, and Liz Lidgett Gallery
 Video: Karin Olah discusses her approach to visual art at KK4

21st-century American artists
Living people
American people of Hungarian descent
1977 births
Maryland Institute College of Art alumni
People from Lancaster County, Pennsylvania
Artists from Charleston, South Carolina